Eibon la Furies are an English black metal band inspired by Victorian themes, especially the occult side of Victorian society. Their sound has always been experimental – with an early leaning towards industrial but this has become more progressive since a full live band has developed.

The band was started by Lord Eibon Blackwood with his love for 'Victoriana Occult' and experimental black metal, and quickly released their first CD in 2006 – Something Wicked This Way Comes followed by Yours Truly... From Hell in 2007. These first two CDs were completed with the help of Lady Titania Blackwood on vocals and Spectral Symphony on keyboards.

In 2008 a live band was put together featuring The Furious Host on bass guitar and Battalion on drums and percussion with the addition of 'live' flag bearers Cara and Leah.

Eibon la Furies have garnered positive reviews from the press and internet who regard the band as something of a unique entity.

Blast! Magazine – "Eibon La Furies are deserving of your attention. They are probably the most "English-sounding" band around at the minute as well, so if your opinion of the UK's metal output has become a little jaded over the last few years this is a good place to return to."

Terrorizer Magazine – "Eibon la Furies manage to induce dizziness with (their) freeform adaptation and juxtaposition of genre shrapnel, from techno beats to goth to fierce BM to neo-folk"

Zero Tolerance Magazine – "This mix of black metal, gothic hysteria and horror movie soundtrack inspired soundscapes is pretty entertaining,worthy of further attention"

Discography

The Immoral Compass (2013 – Released worldwide by Code666)

1. The Compass Awakes [Intro]
2. Immoral Compass to the World
3. Astronomy in Absences
4. Imperial Jackal's Head
5. Flames 1918 (A Song for the Silence)
6. An Enigma in Space and Time
7. Who Watches the Watchers
8. Conjure Me
9. Ascending Through Darkness
10. The Vanguard
11. The End of Everything (Or the beginning of it all)
12. The Compass Remains [Outro]

The Blood of the Realm (2010 – Released worldwide by Code666 as a deluxe 6 panel digipack)

1. The Blood of The Realm [Intro]
2. The Devil is an Englishman
3. Tears of Angels & Dreams of Demons
4. Horse of The Invisible
5. Winter Kings, Wicker Men & Her Infernal Majesty Brigantia
6. Dominion of Will
7. A Shadow Over London Pt 1
8. Yours Truly, From Hell
9. ...And By The Moonlight
10. A Shadow Over London Pt 2
11. I Am Whitechapel
12. A Shadow Over London Pt 3
13. …Of Golden Dawns
14. Dark Designs
15. Infinite Man [Outro]

Yours Truly... From Hell (2007 – Released by The Ministry For Infernal Affairs)

1. Yours Truly...
2. ... And By The Moonlight (Dear Boss Version)
3. The Devil Is An Englishman
4. A Shadow Over London (Pt 1)
5. I Am Whitechapel
6. The Ripper (Judas Priest cover)
7. A Shadow Over London (Pt 2)
8. ... From Hell
9. ... And By The Moonlight (Film Clip)
10. Yours Truly... From Hell (Film Clip)

Something Wicked This Way Come (2006 – Released by The Ministry For Infernal Affairs)

1. Tears of Angels & Dreams of Demons
2. Horse of the Invisible
3. The Lamplighter of Souls
4. ... And By The Moonlight
5. ... Of Dark Woods & Deep Water
6. Dark Designs
7. Transilvanian Hunger (cello and keys) (Darkthrone cover)
8. The Lamplighter of Souls (Film Clip)

Current line-up
 Paul Sims (Lord Eibon) – vocals, guitars, (bass, programming and keyboards on recording)
 Matt Cook (The Furious Host) – bass/vocals
 Jamie Batt (Battalion) – drums
 Neil Purdy – lead guitar

References 
Eibon la Furies sign deal with Code666
BBC News about Eibon la Furies signing to Code666 Records
Eibon la Furies played Bloodstock Open Air Festival in 2009

External links
 Code666 Records with Eibon la Furies news
 Facebook page for Eibon la Furies with band information
 Official Eibon la Furies website

English black metal musical groups
Musical groups established in 2005